The Isarog shrew-rat or Mount Isarog shrew-rat (Rhynchomys isarogensis) is a species of rodent in the family Muridae.
It is found only in the Philippines.

References

Rats of Asia
Rhynchomys
Endemic fauna of the Philippines
Fauna of Luzon
Rodents of the Philippines
Mammals described in 1981
Taxonomy articles created by Polbot